Ramón Isaac Alcaraz was an officer in the Mexican Army who wrote many books about the Mexican–American War, including 1848's Apuntes para la historia de la guerra entre México y los Estados Unidos (which in 1850 Albert C. Ramsey translated into English as The Other Side, or: Notes for the History of the War Between Mexico and the United States, Written in Mexico).

References

19th-century Mexican historians
Mexican soldiers
Year of birth missing
Year of death missing
19th-century male writers